Mr. Lee is a popular fast-food chain in mainland China, specializing in beef noodle soup and other Chinese-style fast food. It is headquartered in Beijing. The chain was formerly called California Beef Noodle King U.S.A..

The first franchise was opened in Beijing in 1988 by a Californian Chinese-American, Li Beiqi, also known as "Mr. Lee".  Li's face can be seen as part of the company logo, in a style similar to KFC's Colonel Sanders logo. Today, there are several hundred franchises are present in many major Chinese cities. Notable locations include Shanghai, Nanjing, Tianjin, Harbin, Changchun, Qingdao and Shenyang. Mr. Lee competes with foreign franchises such as KFC and McDonald's with lower prices and a greater appeal towards Chinese tastes.
The California Chicken ingredients are all from within China and have nothing to do with California.

Expansion
From June 2016, Mr. Lee started opening franchises in Australia, with the first restaurant in Australia being in Burwood.

References

External links 
  

Restaurants in Beijing
Fast-food chains of China
Noodle restaurants